The Wyaralong Dam is a mass concrete gravity dam with an un-gated spillway across the Teviot Brook that is located in the South East region of Queensland, Australia. The main purpose of the dam is for supply of potable water for the Scenic Rim region. The dam was initiated by the Queensland Government in 2006 as a result of the prolonged Millennium drought which saw the catchment areas of South East Queensland's dams receive record low rain. It was completed in 2011.

Location and features
The dam wall itself is split between the localities of Wyaralong and Allenview, but the bulk of impounded water is within Wyaralong.

The Wyaralong Dam was completed prior to the 2010–2011 Queensland floods. On January 11, during the flood period, the Mayors of both Logan City and Scenic Rim said they believed that Logan had been spared a great deal of flood damage because of the dam.

The dam wall is constructed from a medium cementitious mix roller compacted concrete, which is a zero-slump concrete that is placed in 300mm thick lifts and compacted with vibratory compactors. The foundation is a sub horizontal dipping blocky sandstone. The dam cross section is rather squat in order to provide sufficient resistance against potential sliding along foundation bedding planes. The  dam wall holds back the  reservoir when at full capacity. Teviot Brook and the surrounding land is a recognised Aboriginal Pathway with significant cultural heritage values.

The dam is managed by SEQ Water as part of a water security project in the South East Queensland region, known as the South East Queensland Water Grid. The outlet is on the right bank and is capable of abstracting water from any level of the reservoir by the use of baulks. The outlet includes an innovative and operationally complex bidirectional fish lift, which uses a single hopper to transport fish in both upstream and downstream directions.

Conception
The site was identified in a 1990 study, Water Supply Sources in South-East Queensland, as a future source of water supply for the South East Queensland region. In this report, the site of Wyaralong Dam was ranked 13th out of 15 studied possible dam locations in the region. A location on the Albert River at Glendower, also near Beaudesert, was the preferred location and the government subsequently bought back all the land required for the Glendower Dam. A new dam was not expected to be required until 2060 or later and Glendower Dam remained the preferred dam site, the land already fully government owned. Properties previously acquired by the government are progressively being sold to private buyers.

In October 2005, in advance of the state election, the Queensland government announced Wyaralong Dam as the new preferred option, even after recent studies into possible dam locations found a location upstream on the Logan River to be a more reliable option.  After a series of studies, a Senate Inquiry and much contested information, Federal Environment Minister Peter Garrett granted approval for the Wyaralong Dam in November 2008.

The dam is a storage and regulation facility. It does not discharge directly into the piped reticulation network, but rather discharges back into the natural drainage network of creeks and brooks. Water released from the dam flows downstream along Teviot Brook to Cedar Grove Weir, where it is diverted for treatment and use in the piped network.

Construction

The construction was tendered under an alliance contract. In this type of contract risks and rewards are shared by all the proponents including designers constructors and the owner. Queensland Dam Consortium won the tender for the dam's construction, and the Alliance was formed from their members which included Macmahon Construction as the lead contractor, Hydro Tasmania, Snowy Mountains Engineering Corporation, Paul Rizzo and Associates (USA), ASI Contractors (USA) and Queensland Water Infrastructure the special purpose vehicle created by the Queensland Government owner to deliver the project. The Alliance contract for dam construction was for a little over 100 million. However it was widely reported that the building costs for the dam would total 333 million. The latter figure includes the cost of the Bromelton Offpeak Storage Project, Cedar Grove Weir and the reconstruction of a length of the Boonah to Beaudesert Road.

Work on access roads began in early 2009 and construction of the dam wall began in early 2010.  The diversion channel was plugged on 17 December 2010, allowing the dam to begin to fill. The dam site was opened to the public on 3 June 2011. The  of new road between Boonah and Beaudesert were constructed under a separate contract by Fulton Hogan.

The dam cost 380 million to construct, including purchasing farmland flooded by the dam reservoir.

Treatment
By late 2012 the dam still had not been connected to the SEQ Water Grid because it contains water so mineralised it is cheaper to produce desalinated water than to treat it. The Wyaralong water treatment plant is expected to cost 235 million to construct.  Funding for the plant was planned for the 2014/15 financial year. In 2017 SEQ Water external relations manager Mike Foster stated the Wyaralong Water Treatment Plant wouldn't be necessary until "2030 or beyond".

January 2011 floods

As a result of rainfall during the 2010–2011 Queensland floods the dam filled to 100% capacity, just 25 days after the wall was plugged to hold water, but before its completion. By 10 January during the flood period, the  dam held , 80.7 per cent of its  capacity. Parts of the dam were still under construction, but its wall was plugged to hold water on 17 December 2010.

See also

List of dams in Queensland

References

External links

International Water Power and Dam Construction Magazine

Reservoirs in Queensland
Logan River
Scenic Rim Region
Dams completed in 2011
Dams in Queensland
Venues of the 2032 Summer Olympics and Paralympics
2011 establishments in Australia